Channel O is a South African-based music channel which first started transmission in 1997. Its main concept is African music in Africa and the diaspora.

Channel O can be accessed via DStv, a satellite pay TV service for pan-African households. The channel broadcasts a variety of music videos.

It also holds the annual Channel O Music Video Awards ceremony, where artists are awarded for their outstanding contribution to music.

Channel O, in recent years, has lost a significant amount of popularity mainly due to the launch of rival channels MTV Base Africa, Trace Urban and Trace Africa. The channel has been trying several means to gain popularity including the increasingly popular method of creating a South African feed and a Rest of Africa feed (MTV Base and Trace have also adopted this).

Programming

Playlists

Only

This playlist views music videos dedicated to a specific artist or genre.

 Facts Only

Similar to Only, this playlist provides information on the specific artist or genre. This consists of mostly the artist background information, their real name opposed to their stage name, where they grow up, when they entered the entertainment industry, etc.

Crispy Fresh

Crispy Fresh plays the latest newly released music videos of the week.

 O-House

A playlist exclusively for music videos in the house genre, including club and dance.

 Zoom In
Similar to Only, this playlist consists of music dedicated to a specific artist or genre.

Uncensored
A late-night playlist displaying music videos that are uncensored and unedited, showing videos with nudity or sexual activity and strong language.

 The Hit List

Plays the freshest tracks from the biggest artists.

 Best of The Week

A round up of music videos that have appeared on Crispy Fresh.

 Lyrics On The Beat

Music videos shown with their lyrics.

 Collabos

A selection of music video collaborations

Chart Shows
 Ten2One
The top ten music video of a specific genre or region.

 The Channel O Top 30
These are the top 30 most popular music videos, voted for by the viewers on Channel O's website.

Music Shows
iRequest: Celebrity Edition

Interviews with music artists and personalities as they request their favourite music videos.
Massive Music

A 30-minute show hosted by Lalla Hirayama and Smash Afrika about the latest music releases, guest interviews, a countdown of the latest releases and live performances. The show airs on Mzansi Magic and Mzansi Wethu before airing on Channel O. However, the channel offers a blitz-speed bulletin titled Massive Music News during the day, providing updates on the latest music news.
The Mix Up

Music videos are mixed, blended and mashed up by resident DJ Mikey.
Remix Studio

Remix Studio takes a peek at the artist and what inspired them to create a smash hit. True to its name, it also provides a platform for the artist to "remix" their own song.

 Lockdown House Party

Shimza and PH host live performances and a mix of various music tracks during the COVID-19 pandemic.

Specials
Channel O Africa Music Video Awards (CHOAMVAs)*
American Music Awards (AMAs)**
Grammy Awards** 
Billboard Music Awards**

* The Channel O Music Video Awards were last hosted in 2014. MultiChoice is yet to announce whether it will be hosted again

** These award shows are shown live on M-Net or One Magic. Channel O acts as a rerun channel for these award shows.

References

External links
Official Site

Television stations in South Africa
English-language television stations in South Africa
Television channels and stations established in 1993
Television channels and stations established in 1997
Music television channels
Music organisations based in South Africa